Nayoko Yoshikawa (born 18 February 1949) is a Japanese professional golfer who played on the LPGA of Japan Tour (JLPGA) and the LPGA Tour.

Yoshikawa won 29 times on the JLPGA between 1979 and 1995. She was the leading money winner on JLPGA in 1988.

One of Yoshikawa's JLPGA wins was co-sanctioned with the LPGA Tour, the 1984 Mazda Japan Classic.

Yoshikawa finished third at the LPGA Tour's qualifying school tournament in January 1978 and played sparingly on the LPGA Tour from 1978 to 1980. Her 1984 win was as a non-member.

Professional wins

LPGA of Japan Tour wins (29)
1979 (3) Japan LPGA East vs. West, Japan Women's Open, Mita Lakeside Women's Professional
1980 (3) Stanley Ladies, JLPGA Lady Borden Cup, Sanyo Queens 
1982 (4) Okinawa Makiminato Auto Ladies, Mizuno Open, Pioneer Cup, Kosaido Asahi Golf Cup 
1983 (4) Junon Ladies Open, Stanley Ladies, Isuzu Ladies Cup, Fujitsu Ladies
1984 (3) Fujitsu Ladies, Mazda Japan Classic (co-sanctioned with LPGA Tour), Saikai National Park Ladies Open
1985 (1) Uniden Japan Ladies
1986 (1) Dunlop Ladies Open
1987 (3) Kumamoto Central Ladies Cup, Japan Women's Open, Stanley Ladies
1988 (5) Kibun Ladies Classic, Yamaha Cup Ladies Open, Mizuno Open, Stanley Ladies, Itsuki & Orimupikku Ladies 
1990 (1) Itoki Classic
1995 (1) Saishunkan Ladies

Tournament in bold denotes major championships on LPGA of Japan Tour.

LPGA Tour wins (1)

Team appearances
Professional
Handa Cup (representing World team): 2006, 2007

References

External links

Japanese female golfers
LPGA of Japan Tour golfers
Sportspeople from Sapporo
1949 births
Living people
20th-century Japanese women